Free Flying is  live album by pianist Fred Hersch and guitarist Julian Lage which was recorded in New York in 2013 and released by the  Palmetto label.

Reception 

The AllMusic review by Thom Jurek said "It's quite rare when a jazz duet album between two complementary instruments is so intuitive it often sounds like the work of one player with multiple voices. Such is the case on Free Flying".

On All About Jazz, Victor L. Schermer stated "Hersch and Lage mesh superbly and have put together a coherent and listenable set of sophisticated improvisations which fuse baroque counterpoint, punctuated rhythms, and diverse jazz motifs in a disciplined yet exciting way. Simply by virtue of the close coordination of piano and guitar and tightness of performance, the album points up the continuity of music from Bach to bop to modernity, and in this respect represents something of a measuring rod for the development of jazz forms".

In JazzTimes Bill Beuttler wrote "Pianist Fred Hersch and guitarist Julian Lage are similarly masterful players and likeminded souls. Though primarily jazz improvisers, they share affinities for new collaborations, classical forms and soft yet intense dynamics. If they’re more than a generation apart in age, no matter ... Their extraordinary new live recording, Free Flying, stems from a chance meeting in a coffee shop in Boston, a city in which both men have studied and taught. Private sessions led to their performing as a duo this past February at New York City’s Jazz at Kitano, where the program included seven Hersch compositions, most recorded at least once previously and five dedicated to artists he holds dear".

Track listing 
All compositions by Fred Hersch except where noted.
 "Song Without Words #4: Duet" – 6:54
 "Down Home" – 5:53
 "Heartland" – 4:57
 "Free Flying" – 5:04
 "Beatrice" (Sam Rivers) – 5:29
 "Song Without Words #3: Tango" – 5:45
 "Stealthiness" – 5:16
 "Gravity's Pull" – 7:03
 "Monk's Dream" (Thelonious Monk) – 6:24

Personnel 
Musicians
 Fred Hersch – piano
 Julian Lage – guitar

References 

2013 live albums
Fred Hersch live albums
Julian Lage live albums
Palmetto Records live albums